Bhai Nand Lal (1633–1720), also known by his pen name Goya, was a 17th-century Sikh poet in the Punjab region.

Early life 
Lal was born in Ghazni. His father, Diwan Chajju Mal (1600-1652) was a disciple of the 8th Sikh Guru Har Krishan.
Chajju Mal was chief secretary (Diwan) of Dara Shikoh, the eldest son of Shah Jahan. Chajju Mal went along to conquer Afghanistan. Dara Shikoh returned to India while Chajju Mal stayed in Ghazni, Afghanistan, where Bhai Nand Lal was born. There, at the age of 12, Lal started writing Persian poetry with the Takallus of Goya. He learned Sanskrit, Hindi, Arabic, and Persian from his father who was a great scholar himself. Lal was a scholar of Islamic studies too, even though he was never initiated into Islam. 
He lost his mother, Dharga Mal, an Amrithdari Sikh, at 17. At the age of 19 he lost his father. In 1652, Lal settled in Multan, West Punjab, where he married. Lal later became a courtier in the darbar of Guru Gobind Singh; the tenth Sikh Guru. He was one of the fifty-two poets of Guru Gobind Singh's darbar court.

Career 
Thereafter, he moved towards Sikhism, met Guru Gobind Singh in 1682, and later became Amritdhari. After a few months at Anandpur Sahib.

Initially He joined Prince Muazzam as secretary and later rose to become chief secretary.
He left his job with Prince Muazzam to become the personal teacher of the Mughal emperor's son Prince Bahadur Shah 1. 
One day a letter came from a Persian King which also contained a verse from the Quran. The emperor was unable to determine the meaning or find a satisfactory interpretation of this verse. He searched all throughout his court and the entire Mughal empire. He was unable to find a satisfactory interpretation. Upon hearing of his troubles his son, Prince Bahadur Shah 1. Asked his teacher who also being a brilliant poet if he could put together a interpretation for the emperor. Being of Hindu desent it was unorthodox to have a verse from the Quran interpreted by A non Muslim man. Due to such pondering the Emperor allowed this. The interpretation provided, greatly pleased the emperor to such delight. He wanted to award This brilliant poet, although he mentioned to his court. Such a man who carries great wisdom of the Quran cannot be of Hindu faith, he must accept Islam. Upon hearing this Prince Bahadur Shah 1 immediately summoned to provid a imperial horse and asked a close friend Ghyaz Uddin to help escort his teacher to safety. Immediately Bhai Nand Lal was forced to flee to Anandpur Sahib. The only place in the entire Mughal empire that was out of the tyrant emperor's reach. They rode over night,
 and appeared before Guru Gobind Singh in Anandpur Sahib, where he stayed until 1704. 

When Guru Gobind Singh left Anandpur Sahib in 1704 he returned to Multan. In 1707 he joined his master prince Muazzam at and became a source to invite Guru Gobind Singh to help Bahadur Shah in gaining the Delhi Throne. Prince Muazzam later became king of Delhi as King Bahadur Shah. He came to Multan again in 1712 after the death of Bahadur Shah I and started a school of Arabic and Persian.

He died in 1713 in Multan. This school was functioning in 1849 when the British annexed Punjab.

Works
His major works include:
 Diwan-e-Goya
 Zindaginama
 Ganjnama
 Tankhanama
 Jot Bigaas
 Arz-ul-Alfaz
 Tausif-O-Sana
 Khatimat (Poetry)
 Dastoor-ul-Insha
 Faiz-i-Noor

Translations 

His works originally in Persian were translated into Punjabi and English. Translation of Diwan-e-Goya, titled The Pilgrim’s Way by B P L Bedi in English has a foreword from Dr. Sarvepalli Radhakrishnan and was published by Punjabi University Patiala.

See also

 Bhai Gurdas
 Giani Sant Singh Maskeen

References

External links
Bhai Nand Lal Website
Ghazals of Bhai Nand Lal with Explanation
Bhai Nand Lal's Ghazals - Giani Sant Singh Maskeen (live)

Indian Sikhs
History of Sikhism
History of Punjab
Persian-language poets
People from Ghazni Province
1633 births
1713 deaths